starRo is the moniker of Grammy nominated R&B producer Shinya Mizoguchi. His debut album Monday was released world wide October 20, 2016 and subsequently rose to the top of the charts in Japan. In 2016 he became the first Grammy nominated producer from Japan rising him to fame in his country of origin. Uproxx later wrote, "starRo may well be one of the first, true SoundCloud producers to be nominated for a Grammy." The LA-based, Japanese-born producer also became the first to host a Beats1 Radio show focused on Tokyo culture. Since then, he produced for a number of Japanese and Korean R&B/Hip Hop stars including the Korean group Common Cold (Mad Clown and Justhis) called "WASH!WASH!" which went to number 3 in Korea and received critical acclaim in Korea.

Awards and nominations 

|-
| 2016
| Heavy Star Movin' by The Silver Lake Chorus
| Grammy Award for Best Remixed Recording, Non-Classical
| Nominated
|}

Discography

Albums
 Monday (2016)

EP
 Komorebi (2011)
 Soulection White Label: 004 (2013)
 Emotion (2015)

Singles
 "Touching the Void" (2013)
 "Waiting" (2014)
 "California" (2014)
 "House Party" (2015)
 "I Will" (2015)
 "Relapse" (2016)
 "Milk" (2016)
 "Yams" (2016)

Remixes

References 

Japanese record producers
Living people
Remixers
Year of birth missing (living people)